Waterloo is an unincorporated community in Clarke County in the U.S. state of Virginia. Waterloo is located at the crossroads of John Mosby Highway (U.S. Route 17/U.S. Route 50) and Lord Fairfax Highway (U.S. Route 340).

Unincorporated communities in Clarke County, Virginia
Unincorporated communities in Virginia